Eleutherodactylus rufifemoralis is a species of frog in the family Eleutherodactylidae endemic to the extreme eastern Baoruco Mountain Range, Dominican Republic, at elevations of  asl. Its natural habitats are upland mesic broadleaf and pine forests. It is threatened by habitat loss caused by agriculture. It occurs in the Sierra de Bahoruco National Park, but better management of the park is needed.

References

rufifemoralis
Endemic fauna of the Dominican Republic
Amphibians of the Dominican Republic
Amphibians described in 1933
Taxonomy articles created by Polbot